Jomehlu (also Romanized as Jom‘ehlū; also known as Dzhamlu and Jum‘alu) is a village in Qeshlaqat-e Afshar Rural District, Afshar District, Khodabandeh County, Zanjan Province, Iran. At the 2006 census, its population was 117, in 24 families.

References 

Populated places in Khodabandeh County